The 1988–89 Australian region cyclone season was a slightly above average tropical cyclone season. It officially started on 1 November 1988, and officially ended on 30 April 1989.  The regional tropical cyclone operational plan defines a "tropical cyclone year" separately from a "tropical cyclone season"; the "tropical cyclone year" began on 1 July 1988 and ended on 30 June 1989.

Seasonal summary

Systems

Tropical Cyclone Barisaona

Over the next 24 hours the disturbance remained near stationary before moving slowly towards the north-west over the next few days. The JTWC then initiated advisories on Tropical Cyclone 02S during 8 November, with 1-minute sustained windspeeds equivalent to a tropical storm on the SSHS. The system continued to move westwards without intensifying any further until it moved into the South-West Indian Ocean during 11 November where it was named Barisaona, by the Mauritius Meteorological service. The cyclone then dissipated around 23 November.

While Barisaona was in the Australian region TCWC Perth did not monitor it as a named storm.

Severe Tropical Cyclone Ilona

Ilona developed off the Western Australian coast on 12 December 1988 and made landfall northeast of Onslow, Western Australia on 17 December 1988.  Ilona attained a minimum central pressure of 960 mb and maximum wind speed of 85 knots.

Tropical Cyclone Delilah

The tropical low that was to develop into Tropical Cyclone Delilah, was first noted within the South Pacific convergence zone during 28 December to the northeast of Townsville in Queensland, Australia. Over the next few days the system moved eastwards and slowly intensified further before TCWC Brisbane named it Delilah, during 1 January after it had developed into a category 1 tropical cyclone on the Australian scale. Later that day as the system started to move south-eastwards it crossed 160°E and moved out of the Australian region into the South Pacific basin.

Tropical Cyclone John

On 20 January, an area of convection near Sumatra within a monsoon flow became increasingly organised. By 23 January, a low-pressure area developed to the northwest of Christmas Island and the system was classified a tropical low. Initially moving southeast, the system later turned west-southwest on 24 January. After bypassing the islands, the low attained gale-force winds and was named Tropical Cyclone John. John's forward motion slowed by this time as it began recurving east and southeast. By 29 January, the accelerating storm struggled to maintain its structure and was left with an exposed circulation. Weakening below cyclone strength that day, John continued over the open waters of the southeast Indian Ocean before completely losing its identity on 2 February well to the west of Australia.

Severe Tropical Cyclone Kirrily

Severe Tropical Cyclone Kirrily existed from 3 to 11 February.

Tropical Cyclone Leon–Hanitra

A weak tropical low formed between the Cocos and Christmas Islands on 13 February. Moving along a slow, generally westward track, the system steadily organised. After passing south of the Cocos Islands on 17 February, where it produced wind gusts up to  it reached cyclone strength on 18 February. Steady strengthening ensued as the newly named Leon approached the western bounds of the Australian cyclone region. Responsibility of warnings was subsequently passed on to the Mauritius Meteorological Service, at which time it was given the name Hanitra.

Severe Tropical Cyclone Harry

On 7 February, an eastward moving tropical depression developed about 800 km (500 mi) west of Vanuatu. After intensifying to a tropical cyclone the following day, Harry turned southward and further intensified to a severe tropical cyclone before striking New Caledonia on 11 February. After moving back over water, the cyclone turned towards the east-northeast and crossed 160°E, entering the Australian cyclone basin, on 13 February. Around this time, the cyclone's eye had expanded to 85 km (50 mi) in diameter. Throughout the remainder of 15 February and into the following day, Harry became almost stationary before turning towards the southwest. By 17 February the storm weakened below severe tropical cyclone status before exiting the Australian Basin.

Tropical Low 16S

The system subsequently made landfall on Western Australia during 24 February, having nearly become a tropical cyclone on the Australian scale. The system was subsequently last noted over Western Australia during 25 February.

Tropical Cyclone Marcia

Tropical Cyclone Marcia existed from March 2 to March 5.

Severe Tropical Cyclone Ned

Occurring between 26 and 31 March 1989, Ned crossed the Western Australian coast near Rockingham on 1 April 1989.

Prior to Ned's landfall, emergency services across Perth, Western Australia were placed on stand-by. Across southwestern Western Australia, Ned brought gusty winds that caused scattered power outages. Winds in excess of  also took place on Rottnest Island and in Fremantle. Possible gales were observed just south of the Perth metro area in Rockingham. High winds in Collie caused a starting pontoon along the Wellington Dam course in the Australian Rowing Championships to sink. This prompted referees at the event to cancel the remainder of the race. The entire King's Cup portion of the championships was abandoned, marking the first time since World War II that it was cancelled. Excluding times of war or depression, it was the first time in the 111 years of the King's Cup that it had been abandoned entirely. Following the storm, the name Ned was retired and will never be used again for an Australian cyclone.

Severe Tropical Cyclone Aivu

Aivu made landfall near Ayr, Queensland on 4 April 1989, causing serious damage and killing one person.

Severe Tropical Cyclone Orson

Forming out of a tropical low on 17 April, Orson gradually intensified as it tracked towards the west. After attaining Category 5 intensity on 20 April, the storm began to track southward and accelerated. Orson maintained this intensity for nearly two days before making landfall near Dampier. The cyclone rapidly weakened after landfall as it accelerated to the southeast. After moving into the Great Australian Bight on 24 April, the storm dissipated.

Despite Orson's extreme intensity, damage was relatively minimal as it struck a sparsely populated region of Western Australia. The damage delayed the project for nearly two weeks. The most severe impacts took place in Pannawonica, where 70 homes were damaged. Following the storm, cleanup costs reached A$5 million (US$4.1 million). Due to the severity of the storm, the name Orson was retired after the season.

Tropical Cyclone Meena

On 5 May Tropical Cyclone Meena moved into the Australian region, from the South Pacific region as a category 1 tropical cyclone. Over the next couple of days the system weakened as it moved westwards, before it made landfall on the Cape York Peninsular during 9 May. The systems remnants subsequently emerged into the Gulf of Carpentaria, where they dissipated during the following day. There were no reports of any damage to the Cape York Peninsula though it was noted that Meena may have been responsible for some minor damage to the Peninsula.

Tropical Cyclone Ernie

Tropical Cyclone Ernie existed from 9 to 12 May.

Season effects

|-
| Barisona ||  || bgcolor=#| || bgcolor=#| || bgcolor=#| || None || ||  ||
|-
| Ilona ||  || bgcolor=#| || bgcolor=#| || bgcolor=#| || Western Australia ||  ||  ||
|-
| Delilah ||  || bgcolor=#| || bgcolor=#| || bgcolor=#| || Queensland || ||  ||
|-
| John ||  || bgcolor=#| || bgcolor=#| || bgcolor=#| || Cocos Island ||  ||  ||
|-
| Kirrily ||  || bgcolor=#| || bgcolor=#| || bgcolor=#| || None ||  ||  ||
|-
| Leon –Hanitra ||  || bgcolor=#| || bgcolor=#| || bgcolor=#| || None ||  ||  ||
|-
| Harry ||  || bgcolor=#| || bgcolor=#| || bgcolor=#| || None ||  ||  
|-
| 16S ||  || bgcolor=#| || bgcolor=#| || bgcolor=#| || None ||  ||  
|-
| Marcia ||  || bgcolor=#| || bgcolor=#| || bgcolor=#| || None ||  ||  ||
|-
| Ned ||  || bgcolor=#| || bgcolor=#| || bgcolor=#| || Western Australia ||   ||  || 
|-
| Aivu ||  || bgcolor=#| || bgcolor=#| || bgcolor=#| || Queensland ||  || ||
|-
| Orson ||  || bgcolor=#| || bgcolor=#| || bgcolor=#| || Western Australia, South Australia ||  || ||
|-
| Meena ||  || bgcolor=#| || bgcolor=#| || bgcolor=#| || Cape York Peninsula, Queensland, Northern Territory ||  ||  ||
|-
| Ernie ||  || bgcolor=#| || bgcolor=#| || bgcolor=#| || Vanuatu, Solomon Islands, Papua New Guniea ||  ||  ||
|-

See also
 Atlantic hurricane seasons: 1988, 1989
 Pacific hurricane seasons: 1988, 1989
 Pacific typhoon seasons: 1988, 1989
 North Indian Ocean cyclone seasons: 1988, 1989

References

Notes

External links

 
Aust
Australian region cyclone seasons
Tropical cyclones in 1988
Tropical cyclones in 1989